The following highways are numbered 132:

Australia 

  Wilmot Road (Tasmania)
  Bells Blvd (Victoria)

Canada
 New Brunswick Route 132
 Ontario Highway 132
 Prince Edward Island Route 132
 Quebec Route 132

Costa Rica
 National Route 132

Finland
 National Highway 132 (Finland)

India
 National Highway 132 (India)

Ireland
 R132 road (Ireland)

Japan
 Japan National Route 132

Mexico
 Mexican Federal Highway 132

United States
 Alabama State Route 132
 Arkansas Highway 132
 Arkansas Highway 132 (1920s-1990s) (former)
 California State Route 132
 Connecticut Route 132
 Florida State Road 132 (former)
 County Road 132 (Hamilton County, Florida)
 County Road 132 (Suwannee County, Florida)
 Georgia State Route 132
 Hawaii Route 132
 Illinois Route 132
 Indiana State Road 132 (former)
 K-132 (Kansas highway) (former)
 Kentucky Route 132
 Louisiana Highway 132
 Maine State Route 132
 Maryland Route 132
 Massachusetts Route 132
 M-132 (Michigan highway) (former)
 New Hampshire Route 132
 New Mexico State Road 132
 New York State Route 132
 County Route 132 (Fulton County, New York)
 County Route 132 (Monroe County, New York)
 County Route 132 (Onondaga County, New York)
 County Route 132 (Seneca County, New York)
County Route 132A (Seneca County, New York)
 County Route 132 (Sullivan County, New York)
 County Route 132 (Tompkins County, New York)
 North Carolina Highway 132
 Ohio State Route 132
 Oklahoma State Highway 132
 Pennsylvania Route 132
 Tennessee State Route 132 (former)
 Texas State Highway 132
 Texas State Highway Loop 132
 Farm to Market Road 132
 Utah State Route 132
 Vermont Route 132
 Virginia State Route 132
 Virginia State Route 132Y
 Virginia State Route 132 (1923-1928) (former)
 Virginia State Route 132 (1930-1933) (former)
 Virginia State Route 132 (1933-1943) (former)
 Wisconsin Highway 132 (former)
 Wyoming Highway 132

Territories:
 Puerto Rico Highway 132